Frank Matthew "Duke" Hanny  (October 12, 1897 – September 3, 1946) was an American football end who played eight seasons in the National Football League (NFL). Hanny was the first player to be ejected in an NFL game in history, as he and Green Bay Packers player Tillie Voss exchanged punches in a game.

He died in Aurora, Illinois on September 3, 1946 after a long illness. He was buried there at Mount Olivet Cemetery.

References

1897 births
1946 deaths
American football ends
Chicago Bears players
Green Bay Packers players
Indiana Hoosiers football players
Portsmouth Spartans players
Providence Steam Roller players
Sportspeople from Aurora, Illinois
Players of American football from Illinois